The Aiguille Noire de Peuterey (3,773 m) is a mountain of the Mont Blanc massif in Italy, forming part of the Peuterey ridge to the summit of Mont Blanc with its higher neighbour, the Aiguille Blanche de Peuterey.

The best-known route on the mountain is the south ridge (TD), first climbed by Karl Brendel and Hermann Schaller, on 26 and 27 August 1930; it remains one of the great classic rock routes in the massif.

The first ascent of the complete Peuterey ridge including the Aiguille Noire de Peuterey (the Intégrale) was on 28–31 July 1934 by Adolf Göttner, Ludwig Schmaderer and Ferdinand Krobath. On 21 August 2010 23-year-old Chloé Graftiaux, a leading Belgian sport climber, fell to her death on the mountain.

Photo gallery

References

External links
 The Aiguille Noire de Peuterey on SummitPost
The Aiguille Noire de Peuterey on camptocamp.org

Alpine three-thousanders
Mountains of the Graian Alps
Mountains of Aosta Valley
Mont Blanc massif